Hellraiser: Deader (also known as Hellraiser VII: Deader) is a 2005 American slasher horror film and the seventh installment in the Hellraiser series. Directed by Rick Bota, the original script was written by Neal Marshall Stevens. As with Hellraiser: Hellseeker it began as an unrelated spec script, which was subsequently rewritten (by Tim Day) as a Hellraiser film. Like Inferno, series creator Clive Barker did not have even a cursory involvement in the production of Deader.

Deader was filmed on location in Romania in 2002. It saw only a handful of isolated preview screenings in the following years before finally being released straight to video in the United States on June 7, 2005.

Plot
Reporter Amy Klein (Kari Wuhrer) is sent to Bucharest at the behest of her boss, Charles (Simon Kunz), to investigate a videotape depicting the ritualistic murder - and subsequent reanimation - of a member of a cult calling themselves "The Deaders". Amy tracks down the return address of the tape and discovers the corpse of its sender, Marla, holding the Lament Configuration. She returns to her hotel and opens the box, triggering an apparent dream in which she summons Pinhead (Doug Bradley). Amy delves into Bucharest's subculture and meets Joey, who warns her about the Deaders and notices that Amy has a 'self destructive thing'.

Amy pursues leads, ultimately tracking down Winter LeMarchand (Paul Rhys), the leader of the cult. Winter, as the descendant of the toymaker who designed the puzzle box, believes he is destined to access the realm of the Cenobites and become their master. Unable to open the box himself, Winter believes that only an individual exhibiting trauma-induced nihilism can open the box. To this end, he founded the Deaders and attracted emotionally vulnerable followers so that he could kill them and reanimate them. Winter does this to Amy, resulting in her experiencing an extended waking dream in which she relives her father's physical and sexual abuse and her subsequent murder of him as a child.

Coming back to the living world, Amy successfully opens the box and summons the Cenobites. Pinhead expresses disdain for Winter and his family, denying that any mortal could ever control the Cenobites. He proceeds to slaughter the Deaders before indicating to Amy that she is now indebted to them by opening the box, saying that her father has been waiting for her in Hell. Rather than be taken, Amy kills herself, resulting in the box closing and sending out an electrical charge that banishes the Cenobites back to Hell and causes the Deaders' compound to explode. Later, Charles, unaware of Amy's whereabouts, assigns a new female journalist to investigate the tape. The film ends with a reporter holding up the puzzle box, which has been recovered from the destroyed compound.

Cast
 Kari Wuhrer as Amy Klein
 Doug Bradley as Pinhead
 Paul Rhys as Winter LeMarchand
 Simon Kunz as Charles Richmond
 Marc Warren as Joey
 Georgina Rylance as Marla
 Ionut Chermenski as Group Leader
 Hugh Jorgin as The Arrogant Reporter
 Linda Marlowe as Betty
 Madalina Constantin as Anna
 Ioana Abur as Katia 
 Constantin Barbulescu as The Landlord (as Costi Barbulescu) 
 Daniel Chirea as Mr. Klein
 Maria Pintea as Young Amy Klein

Production 
In 2002, Dimension Films hired screenwriter Peter Briggs to write the seventh entry in the Hellraiser series after being impressed with his unmade script for Freddy vs. Jason. Briggs' script, entitled Hellraiser: Lament, set out to expand upon the first four films, ignoring Inferno and Hellseeker. Other potential subtitles considered were Jihad, Nemesis, and The New Order. Briggs' pitch was discarded for being too high budgeted, leading to the studio opting to retool Neil Marshall Stevens's spec script Deader, which was submitted to Dimension Films in 2000 during the production of his script Thirteen Ghosts and had been planned to be produced by Stan Winston. As in the final film, it entailed a newspaper reporter being sent to Romania to cover an underground cult who have discovered the secret of immortality and had gained contact with an otherworldly dimension, but did not feature connections to the Hellraiser series. Although Tim Day had wanted to write a direct sequel to Hellraiser: Hellseeker featuring a final conflict between Pinhead and Kirsty, Bob Weinstein directed him to rewrite Deader into a Hellraiser sequel similar in tone to the Japanese horror films Ring and Pulse. After a brief delay during the production of the 2006 American remake of Pulse, work on Deader resumed. Scott Derrickson was approached to direct but declined, and Rick Bota was rehired from the previous film. The film was originally rewritten to take place in London and later the Lower East Side of Manhattan before the producers opted to film it simultaneously with another Hellraiser sequel, titled Hellraiser: Hellworld in Romania, between October and December 2002, to save costs. Production was difficult due to the inability of the Americans in the cast and crew to understand the Romanian set workers and actors.

Release

Home media
The film was released on DVD on June 7, 2005 by Buena Vista Home Entertainment. It debuted on the Blu-ray format for the first time on March 10, 2013 by Echo Bridge Entertainment. The disc is rare, as it has since gone out of print.

Reception
Based on 7 reviews, the film received a 14% on Rotten Tomatoes with an average rating of 3.7 out of 10.

Sequel

References

External links

 
 

2005 direct-to-video films
2005 horror films
2005 films
American supernatural horror films
American direct-to-video films
Direct-to-video horror films
Films based on works by Clive Barker
Hellraiser films
Direct-to-video interquel films
Films shot in Bucharest
Miramax films
Dimension Films films
2000s English-language films
2000s American films
2000s British films